Tadeusz Maria Rostworowski (1860-1928) was a Polish architect and painter.

He was born on 21 March 1860 in Kowalewszczyzna in Congress Poland.  After completing gymnasium in Warsaw, he entered the Academy of Fine Arts in Saint Petersburg, where he obtained a diploma degree in architecture in 1885. He was taught by Alfred Parland and Vasil Kennel. He furthered his studies in Kraków, Munich and Paris.

His major works included:
 Puttkamer's palace in Bolcieniki, in English Neo-Gothic style (c. 1890–1896)
 Imperial Palace in Białowieża, in collaboration with N. J. de Rochefort (dismantled in 1950s)
 Expansion of manor house owned by the Chomiński family (wooden, 18th century), in 
 St. Georges Hotel in Vilnius (1893) 
 Reconstruction of  Ignacy Korwin-Milewski's  palace, in Neo-Baroque style (1895)
 Neo-Gothic expansion of Władysław Tyszkiewicz's palace in Lentvaris (1899), in collaboration with Belgian architect de Waegh
 Manor of the Wańkowicz family in  Rudaków (1900), in collaboration with Bronisław Mineyko
 Reconstruction project of  Józef Biszewski's palace in Łyntupy, in Neo-Renessaince style
 railway management building in Vilnius

Rostworowski built or rebuilt nearly thirty churches in Podlachia and Lithuania, among others: Neo-Renessance church in Parafianowo, churches in Bieniakonie (1901), Lentvaris, Molėtai, Kreva,  Baltoji Vokė and Šalčininkai.

In 1898, he married Zofia (née Oskierka), with whom he had son Andrzej and daughter Maria Róża. Besides his architectural profession, he was also a keen painter. He died suddenly of heart attack, on 23 August 1928.

Gallery

References

19th-century Polish architects
1860 births
1928 deaths
Rostworowski (Nałęcz)
Architects from Vilnius